Princess Elizabeth Caroline of Great Britain (10 January 1741 – 4 September 1759) was one of the children of Frederick, Prince of Wales, and Princess Augusta of Saxe-Gotha. She was a granddaughter of King George II and sister of King George III.

Life

Princess Elizabeth was born at Norfolk House, St James's Square, Westminster. Her father was The Prince Frederick, Prince of Wales, eldest son of King George II and Caroline of Ansbach. Her mother was The Princess of Wales (née Augusta of Saxe-Gotha). She was christened twenty-five days later at Norfolk House, by The Bishop of Oxford, Thomas Secker — her godparents were The Margrave of Brandenburg-Ansbach (her first cousin once-removed by marriage; for whom The Lord Baltimore (Gentleman of the Bedchamber to her father) stood proxy), The Queen of Denmark (for whom Anne, Viscountess Irwin stood proxy) and the Duchess of Saxe-Gotha (her maternal aunt by marriage, for whom Lady Jane Hamilton stood proxy).

Little is known of her short life other than a fragment preserved in the Letters of Walpole.

She died on 4 September 1759 at Kew Palace, London and was buried at Westminster Abbey.

Ancestors

See also
List of British princesses

References

1741 births
1759 deaths
18th-century British people
18th-century British women
British princesses
Burials at Westminster Abbey
House of Hanover
People from Westminster
Children of Frederick, Prince of Wales